Søndergårde is a neighborhood of Hadsund, Denmark. He district has a population of 1.500.

Literature 
  Hadsund – fra ladested til industriby, af Vibeke Foltmann m.fl., udgivet af Sparekassen Hadsund 1983, 
  Lise Andersen, Erling Gammelmark og Heino Wessel Hansen, Hadsund – en by bliver til, Hadsund Egns Museum 2004. 
  Lise Andersen Foreningsliv i Hadsund 1884-1994, udgivet af Hadsund Håndværker og Borgerforening 1994. 
  Arne Lybech, Hadsund Bogen 2011, November 2011. 
  Arne Lybech, Hadsund Bogen 2012, November 2012. 
  Karl-Erik Frandsen: Vang og tægt : Studier over dyrkningssystemer og agrarstrukturer i Danmarks landsbyer 1682-83, Bygd, 1983
  Henrik Pedersen: De danske Landbrug fremstillet paa Grundlag af Forarbejderne til Christian V.s Matrikel 1688. Udgivet efter hans Død paa Bekostning af Carlsbergfondet (1928), Landbohistorisk Selskab, København, 1975

References 

Neighbourhoods in Denmark
Hadsund